In quantum field theory, the 't Hooft loop is a magnetic analogue of the Wilson loop for which spatial loops give rise to thin loops of magnetic flux associated with magnetic vortices. They play the role of a disorder parameter for the Higgs phase in pure gauge theory. Consistency conditions between electric and magnetic charges limit the possible 't Hooft loops that can be used, similarly to the way that the Dirac quantization condition limits the set of allowed magnetic monopoles. They were first introduced by Gerard 't Hooft in 1978 in the context of possible phases that gauge theories admit.

Definition 

There are a number of ways to define 't Hooft lines and loops. For timelike curves  they are equivalent to the gauge configuration arising from the worldline traced out by a magnetic monopole. These are singular gauge field configurations on the line such that their spatial slice have a magnetic field whose form approaches that of a magnetic monopole

where in Yang–Mills theory  is the generally Lie algebra valued object specifying the magnetic charge. 't Hooft lines can also be inserted in the path integal by requiring that the gauge field measure can only run over configurations whose magnetic field takes the above form.

These modified gauge transformations are not true gauge transformations as they do not leave the action invariant. For temporal loops they create the aforementioned field configurations while for spatial loops they instead create loops of color magnetic flux, referred to as center vortices. By constructing such gauge transformations, an explicit form for the 't Hooft loop can be derived by introducing the Yang–Mills conjugate momentum operator

If the loop  encloses a surface , then an explicitly form of the 't Hooft loop operator is

Using Stokes' theorem this can be rewritten in a way which show that it measures the electric flux through , analogous to how the Wilson loop measures the magnetic flux through the enclosed surface.

There is a close relation between 't Hooft and Wilson loops where given a two loops  and  that have linking number , then the 't Hooft loop  and Wilson loop  satisfy

where  is an element of the center of the gauge group. This relation can be taken as a defining feature of 't Hooft loops. The commutation properties between these two loop operators is often utilized in topological field theory where these operators form an algebra.

Disorder operator  
The 't Hooft loop is a disorder operator since it creates singularities in the gauge field, with their expectation value distinguishing the disordered phase of pure Yang–Mills theory from the ordered confining phase. Similarly to the Wilson loop, the expectation value of the 't Hooft loop can follow either the area law

On the basis of the commutation relation between the 't Hooft and Wilson loops, four phases can be identified for  gauge theories that additionally contain scalars in representations invariant under the center  symmetry. The four phases are
 Confinement: Wilson loops follow the area law while 't Hooft loops follow the perimeter law.
 Higgs phase: Wilson loops follow the perimeter law while 't Hooft loops follow the area law.
 Confinement together with a partially Higgsed phase: both follow the area law.
 Mixed phase: both follow the perimeter law.
In the third phase the gauge group is only partially broken down to a smaller non-abelian subgroup. The mixed phase requires the gauge bosons to be massless particles and does not occur for  theories, but is similar to the phase for abelian theory is the Coulomb phase.

Since 't Hooft operators are creation operators for center vortices, they play an important role in the center vortex scenario for confinement. In this model, it is these vortices that lead to the area law of the Wilson loop through the random fluctuations in the number of topologically linked vortices.

Charge constraints 

In the presence of both 't Hooft lines and Wilson lines, a theory requires consistency conditions similar to the Dirac quantization condition which arises when both electric and magnetic monopoles are present. This can be formulated more precisely by introducing the weights  of the Lie algebra, which span the weight lattice .

Due to Wilson lines, the 't Hooft charge must satisfy the generalized Dirac quantization condition , which must hold for all representations of the Lie algebra.

The generalized quantization condition is equivalent to the demand that  holds for all weight vectors. To get the set of vectors  that satisfy this condition, one must consider roots  which are adjoint representation weight vectors. These vectors have the useful property that  meaning that the only magnetic charges allowed for the 't Hooft lines are ones that are in the co-root lattice

More general classes of dyonic line operators, with both electric and magnetic charges, can also be constructed. Sometimes called Wilson–'t Hooft line operators, they are defined by pairs of charges  up to the identification that for all  it holds that

Line operators play a role in indicating differences in gauge theories of the form  that differ by the center subgroup . Unless they are compactified, these theories do not differ in local physics and no amount of local experiments can deduce the exact gauge group of the theory. Despite this, the theories do differ in their global properties, such as having different sets of allowed line operators.

References 

Gauge theories
Phase transitions
Magnetic monopoles